The Green Eyed Monster is a lost 1919 Black and White silent film action adventure with little to scant information as to its release. It was produced by the Norman Film Manufacturing Company, a historic all-black film production company. Various dates of release are quoted in 1919 and 1921.

Cast
Jack Austin
Louise Dunbar
Steve Reynolds
Robert A. Stuart

See also
 The Green-Eyed Monster (1916 film)
 The Green-Eyed Monster (2001 film)

References

External links

 lobby poster

1919 films
American silent feature films
Lost American films
Lost action adventure films
1919 lost films
Rail transport films
Films set in Oklahoma
Race films
American black-and-white films
American action adventure films
1910s action adventure films
Eye color
1910s American films
Silent action adventure films
1910s English-language films